333 is a year. (For BC, see 333 BC)

333 may also refer to:
 333 (number)
 New York State Route 333
 333 (Green Jellÿ album), 1994
 333 (Bladee album), 2020
 "333" (song), a 2016 song by Against Me!
 333 (Tinashe album), 2021
 #333, an album by Paty Cantú